The Food City Dirt Race is an annual 250-lap,  NASCAR Cup Series points race held at the Bristol Motor Speedway in Bristol, Tennessee. This is one of two NASCAR races held at Bristol, the other being the Bass Pro Shops NRA Night Race. It was the first venue of the 2007 NASCAR schedule to host the fifth-generation NASCAR premiership race car, a race won by Kyle Busch. For much of its history, from 1961 to 1992 the race was run on the original asphalt surface, then on concrete from 1993 to 2020 after Bristol changed surfaces, but was moved to a dirt layout beginning in 2021.

Kyle Busch is the defending race winner as of 2022.

History

In 2008, Bristol Motor Speedway President & General Manager Jeff Byrd requested that NASCAR move the spring race to a later Spring date, to avoid the problems with rain, snow, and sleet that hit the area in late winter and early spring. This was not carried out until 2015. In 2015, the race moved from mid-March to April. Though every race besides 2016 has had some sort of rain alter the race including moving the race to Monday in 2017 and 2018.

In 2011, title sponsor Food City announced it would honor former Speedway President and General Manager Jeff Byrd, who died in October 2010, by renaming the 2011 Spring race the Jeff Byrd 500 presented by Food City.

In 2015, the race was renamed the Food City 500 In Support Of Steve Byrnes And Stand Up To Cancer to support NASCAR on Fox broadcaster Steve Byrnes in his battle with cancer, in association with the Entertainment Industry Foundation.

The 2020 race was dubbed the Food City presents the Supermarket Heroes 500 to honor grocery store workers during the COVID-19 pandemic.

In 2021, the race shifted to a dirt surface version of the track and was renamed the Food City Dirt Race. The race's stage lengths were initially set at 75 each for the first two segments followed by 100 in the final stage, but stages 1–2 were later adjusted to be 100 laps apiece following Friday practices.

In 2022, the race became a night race, and was run on Easter Sunday. Part of the reason it was moved from daylight to nighttime is because of visibility issues that plagued the event in 2021 with sunlight reflecting off the dirt.

Notable races
1968: David Pearson won after a lengthy duel with Richard Petty and LeeRoy Yarbrough in a race prominently featured on the television series Car & Track.
1971: Pearson won after tagging James Hylton into the wall; Pearson edged Richard Petty after Petty erased a two-lap deficit.
1972: Mechanic (and later car owner) Junior Johnson saw the first of a plethora of Bristol wins over the ensuing two decades as Bobby Allison drove his Chevrolet to an easy win.
1973: Driving Junior's Chevy, Cale Yarborough led all 500 laps, a feat he duplicated at Nashville in 1978 and by Jeff Burton at New Hampshire International Speedway in 2000.
1974: Chevrolets swept the top ten finishing spots led by Yarborough.
1975: Richard Petty posted only his second career Bristol win.
1977: Cale led all but five laps in a race where five other drivers (including Janet Guthrie) needed relief help.
1979: After Cale crashed out with Buddy Baker, rookie Dale Earnhardt took his first win.
1981: Darrell Waltrip drove Johnson's Buick and edged Ricky Rudd, who was driving Waltrip's former car, the DiGard Racing Oldsmobile.  Joe Millikan got into a wreck with Benny Parsons and said, "I lost my cool," to which car owner Bud Moore vowed, "I'll straighten out Millikan's cool."
1984: Waltrip posted his seventh straight Bristol win and the eighth straight for Junior Johnson.
1986: Rusty Wallace posted his first career win.
1987: Dale Earnhardt was involved in several crashes en route to the win; Richard Petty finished second.
1989: Wallace survived a chaotic race with multiple crashes and a wildcard victory bid by Greg Sacks.
1990: A spirited event ended in a wild finish; Sterling Marlin was spun out by Ricky Rudd on the final lap while Davey Allison held off a last-lap charge from Mark Martin to win by inches.
1991: Grasping for a solution to pit road crashes emanating from numerous incidents in 1990 (and never considering revoking the pit closure rule that was the ultimate cause), NASCAR had banned tire changes under yellow; for Bristol, this was replaced with the staggering of pit stops based on qualifying line — all "odd" cars (qualified first, third, etc.) would pit first under yellow while "even" cars would pit a lap later; the cars were denoted "odd" and "even" with stickers on their windshields after qualifying; restarts would be double-file based on "odd" and "even" stickered cars.  More "even" cars wound up in contention, and this created chaos.  Rusty Wallace was able to pass cars under caution to move into his proper restart line, and this helped him come back from two laps down on two occasions.  The lead changed 41 times, a short track record, as Wallace edged Ernie Irvan at the finish.  Sterling Marlin suffered burns in a fiery melee and needed relief help in subsequent weeks from Charlie Glotzbach.
1992: Alan Kulwicki won the race; the last to be held at Bristol before the switch from asphalt to concrete pavement.
1993: Wallace dominated days after defending race winner, and defending Winston Cup champion Alan Kulwicki died in a plane crash.
1994: An ill-timed yellow trapped Geoff Bodine a lap down and put Dale Earnhardt into the lead en route to the win.  Bodine had begun dominating the race in the car formerly owned by Kulwicki and running Hoosier Tires; with the Hoosiers Bodine was able to skip tire changes that Goodyear-shod cars had to make.
1995: Jeff Gordon took the win, his third in the season's first six races; the race saw notable performances resulting in top-five finishes for Darrell Waltrip and Bobby Hamilton.
1997: Gordon punted Rusty Wallace sideways on the final lap for the win.
1999: Wallace ran away at the end, while John Andretti rallied to finish fourth; Andretti's Petty Enterprises Pontiac was impounded after the race as NASCAR had a disagreement with the engine's compression ratio; the engine, though, cleared on reinspection.
2000: Rusty Wallace scores his 50th NASCAR Cup Series win.
2001: Elliott Sadler edged Andretti for his first win, and the first 1-2 finish for the Wood Brothers and Petty Enterprises since 1977.
2002: With NASCAR running high downforce on the cars via big rear spoiler and low airdam clearance, and running very hard tires, Kurt Busch pitted on Lap 325 and never visited the pits again. He bumped Jimmy Spencer for the lead and went on to claim his first Winston Cup win. The move was one of several incidents to occur between Busch and Spencer in what was becoming a heated feud. Rusty Wallace was incensed at the manner with which Busch won the race (by not pitting when others did and thus winning on old tires with no drop in speed) enough that he lobbied NASCAR to cut downforce and go to softer tires in later years to force pitstops.
2003: In what was the 2,000th race in NASCAR Cup Series history, Kurt Busch came back from a spin to win the race. Also during the race, Kyle Petty got clipped by Ward Burton in the left rear and turned him very abruptly and into the wall driver's side. Petty's crash was then the biggest crash recorded by the black box, recording 80 G's of force on Petty. 
2004: The final race for Pontiac in the Cup Series as a whole, as Hermie Sadler No. 02 finished 31st.
2005: Slight contact between Bobby Hamilton Jr. and Ken Schrader on lap 332 triggered a 14-car wreck. While Kevin Harvick was the winner, 22nd-place Bobby Labonte finished 32 laps down, a rarity for the series over the previous 25 seasons.  
2007: The Car of Tomorrow debuted.  After Joe Gibbs Racing dominated the race, Kyle Busch drove a Hendrick Chevy to the win, then pointedly ripped the poor raceability of the COT in victory lane.
2008: Dale Jarrett's last race.
2010: Jimmie Johnson had never won at Bristol until this race; it was his 50th Winston Cup Series win.
2011:  After track president Jeff Byrd's death in late 2010, Food City and Bristol Motor Speedway agree to name the race in memory of Byrd in a one-year-only deal.
2013: Kyle Busch won the pole with a then-new track qualifying record at 14.813 seconds (129.535 mph). Kasey Kahne won his first Bristol race. The race also marked the start of a feud between Denny Hamlin and Joey Logano, after Hamlin spun Logano during the race.
2014: Denny Hamlin started on pole with a new track record, his first pole of the season. The race was delayed twice, just like the Daytona 500, for rain. Matt Kenseth was involved in a wreck at lap 163 when Timmy Hill rear-ended into him after caution was called for a spin by Cole Whitt. Carl Edwards was leading with a few laps left when a mysterious caution was out. During an attempt for a Green-white-checkered finish, the rain started falling and the race was unable to be restarted and would end under caution.
2015: The race was scheduled to begin at noon ET and be televised by Fox, but rain delayed the start for 79 minutes.  A crash between teammates Brad Keselowski and Joey Logano brought out the caution on lap 19. During the caution, rain began to fall again. The rain was delayed until night and because Fox had another programming, aired on Fox Sports 1. The race resumed at approximately 6:30 p.m. ET, almost 5 hours after the 1st green flag. Although rain threatened to end the race twice, the race was run to completion. Matt Kenseth won, breaking a 51 race winless streak.
2018: Rain and four red flags plagued the race on Sunday only getting in 204 laps with the race continuing and concluding on Monday. It tied the record for most red flags in a single NASCAR race with the 2015 Quicken Loans 400, also red-flagged four times. All four red flags in that event were due to weather. Kyle Larson led the most laps for the second straight year (200) but got spun by the lapped car of Ryan Newman at lap 325. Larson was back in the lead with less than 100 laps to go; he was heading for victory until pole-sitter Kyle Busch performed the "Bump n' Run" on Larson with 6 laps to go to steal the win, his 7th at Bristol.
2021 The NASCAR Cup Series ran its first race on dirt since 1970 (51 years). After multiple accidents took out several of the pre race favorites, Joey Logano survived an overtime restart to become the first Cup Series driver to win on dirt in the modern era.
2022 On the last lap, Tyler Reddick and Chase Briscoe battled for the win with Reddick in position for his first career Cup Series win. In Turn 3, Briscoe sent it in hard to pass Reddick and the two ended up making contact sending both of them spinning around. Reddick got back going but was passed just before the start-finish line by the 3rd place car in Kyle Busch and Busch took home the win with Reddick in 2nd.

Past winners

Notes
1973: Race started on March 11 but suspended until March 25 after 52 laps due to rain.
1974: Race shortened due to energy crisis.
1985: Race postponed from March 31 due to rain.
1996: Race shortened due to rain.
2007–09, 2015 and 2021: Races extended due to NASCAR overtime.
2014: Race extended due to NASCAR overtime, but overtime restart was aborted and race called due to rain.
2017: Race postponed from Sunday to Monday due to rain.
2018: Race suspended until Monday due to rain.
2020: Race postponed from April 5 to May 31 due to the COVID-19 pandemic.
2021: Race postponed from Sunday to Monday due to heavy rain and flash flooding.

Track length notes
1961–1969: 0.5 mile course
Since 1970: 0.533 mile course

Multiple winners (drivers)

Multiple winners (teams)

Manufacturer wins

References

External links
 

1961 establishments in Tennessee
 
NASCAR Cup Series races
Recurring sporting events established in 1961
Annual sporting events in the United States